Barry Beijer (born 6 December 1989) is a Dutch footballer who plays for TEC.

Club career
He made his professional debut in the Eerste Divisie for Achilles '29 on 7 August 2015 in a game against Jong Ajax.

References

External links
 
 

1989 births
People from Zevenaar
Living people
Dutch footballers
De Treffers players
Achilles '29 players
SV Spakenburg players
VV DOVO players
SV TEC players
Eerste Divisie players
Tweede Divisie players
Derde Divisie players
Association football defenders
Footballers from Gelderland
21st-century Dutch people